Acatitla is a station along Line A of the Mexico City Metro. It is an aboveground station. The station has connections to bus routes 162B, 163, 163A, 163B, 164, and 166. Service at this station began 12 August 1991.

Ridership

References

External links
 
 Mexico City subway (underground) map

Acatitla
Railway stations opened in 1991
1991 establishments in Mexico
Mexico City Metro stations in Iztapalapa